Katarzyna Krenz (born 24 January 1953 in Gdańsk, Poland) is a Polish writer, poet and painter.

Biography
Krenz is best known as the author of the novels W ogrodzie Mirandy (In Miranda's Garden), Lekcja tańca (Dance Lesson), Krolowa pszczół (The Queen of Bees) and Księżyc myśliwych (Moon Hunters). A graduate from the University of Gdańsk, she is a poet, journalist and literary translator, as well as a watercolour painter. Her works have been published worldwide. Among her translations are the works of Amos Oz, John Updike and Richard Russo. From 2005 to 2014 she has lived with her husband Jacek Krenz in Portugal.

Literary awards 
 2010 – I prize in XXII National Meetings of Literary Generations (Ogólnopolskie Literackie Spotkania Pokoleń). Kruszwica
 1998 – Honorary mention in Literary Competition of Stefan Flukowski in Szczecin.

Works

Novels 
 Krenz K., Bielak J. Księżyc myśliwych. ZNAK Cracow  (2015)
 Królowa pszczół, Wydawnictwo Literackie, Cracow  (2011)
 Lekcja tańca, Wydawnictwo Literackie, Kraków  (2009)
 Kropla ochry, dwie krople pamięci.
 W ogrodzie Mirandy, Wydawnictwo Literackie, Cracow ,  (2008)

Poetry 
Poezine 01-06 Quincunx i kostka domino, artbook, Ogarnij Miasto Sp. z o.o. Gdańsk,  (2018) 
 Watermarks. poetry & watercolours., Kasia Krenz & Jacek Krenz, 
 Museu de Lanifícios. Covilha, Portugal (2006)
 Old Market House Arts Centre. Dungarvan, Ireand (2006)
 Szukam cię, morze,  Gdańsk/Łeba (2005) 
 Katarzyna Krenz, Czesław Tumielewicz, Seaside Evening / Wieczór nad morzem, Gdańsk-Łeba  (2005)
 Kartki z podróży do Łeby (with Ewa Marią Slaska) Gdańsk  (2001)
 Z nieznajomą w podróży. Tower Press, Gdańsk  (2000)
 La Tour, Degnodiverso, Torino, Italy (1999)

Non-fiction 
 The Eye of Abstraction. World in the Paintings of Professor Tadeusz Kielanowski / Oko abstrakcji. Świat w obrazach Profesora Tadeusza Kielanowskiego. Domena, Warsaw,   (2020)

References

External links
 Ksieżyc Myśliwych

1953 births
Living people
21st-century Polish poets
21st-century Polish novelists
Polish women novelists
Polish women poets
21st-century Polish women writers